The 2017–18 Deutsche Eishockey Liga season was the 24th season since the founding of the Deutsche Eishockey Liga.

EHC Red Bull München defended their title to win the third consecutive title.

Teams

Regular season

Standings

Results

Matches 1–26

Matches 27–52

Playoffs

Bracket

Playoff qualification
The playoff qualification were played between 7 and 9 March 2018 in a best-of-three mode.

Grizzlys Wolfsburg vs. Schwenninger Wild Wings

Iserlohn Roosters vs. Fischtown Pinguins

Quarterfinals
The quarterfinals will be played between 14 and 27 March 2018 in a best-of-seven mode.

EHC München vs. Fischtown Pinguins

Eisbären Berlin vs. Grizzlys Wolfsburg

Thomas Sabo Ice Tigers vs. Kölner Haie

ERC Ingolstadt vs. Adler Mannheim

Semifinals
The semifinals were played between 29 March 8 11 April 2018 in a best-of-seven mode.

EHC München vs. Adler Mannheim

Eisbären Berlin vs. Thomas Sabo Ice Tigers

Final
The final was played between 13 and 26 April in a best-of-seven mode.

Rule changes
Midway through the season, the league implemented the "David Leggio Rule:" in the event the goaltender deliberately knocks the goalposts off its moorings to prevent a score, the score is awarded anyway. The rule is named after Leggio, a goaltender for Red Bull München who is infamous for the tactic.

References

External links
Official website

2017–18
DEL
2017–18 in German ice hockey